Dedication often refers to various religious and secular ceremonies and practices.

Child dedication, a Christian ceremony
Pariṇāmanā (Sanskrit), commonly rendered in English as Dedication
Hanukkah, a Jewish holiday commemorating the Maccabean Revolt
Dedication often refers to honor or tribute:
Dedication (art)

Dedication may also refer to:

Ceremonies
Grand opening
Ribbon cutting ceremony

Film and television
 Dedication (film), a 2007 film starring Billy Crudup and Mandy Moore
 Dedications (MuchMusic), a Canadian television program
 "Dedication" (The Unit), a television episode

Literature
 Dedication (publishing), in book design, a page in the front matter
 "Dedication" (short story), a 1988 story by Stephen King
 Dedication or The Stuff of Dreams, a 2005 play by Terrence McNally
 "For John F. Kennedy His Inauguration" or "Dedication", a 1961 poem by Robert Frost

Music

Classical
"Dedication", a 1918 composition by Peter Warlock

Albums
 Dedication (Ahmed Abdullah album), 1998
 Dedication (Bay City Rollers album) or the title song, 1976
 Dedication (Chief Keef album), 2017
 Dedication (Gary U.S. Bonds album) or the title song, 1981
 Dedication (Herbie Hancock album), 1974
 Dedication (Mal Waldron album) or the title song, 1985
 Dedication (Raised Fist album) or the title song, 2002
 Dedication (Robin Eubanks and Steve Turre album), 1989
 Dedication (Steve Kuhn album) or the title song, 1998
 Dedication (Zomby album), 2011
 Dedication!, by Duke Pearson, 1970
 Dedication: The Very Best of Thin Lizzy or the title song, 1991
 Dedications (Toshiko Akiyoshi Trio album), 1976
 Dedications II, Akiyoshi album released in the U.S. as Dedications, 1977
 The Dedication, a mixtape by Lil Wayne, with DJ Drama, 2005
Dedication, an EP by Kalin and Myles, 2014
Ihda' (Dedication), by DAM, 2006

Songs
 "Dedication" (song), by Nipsey Hussle
 "Dedication", by Beastie Boys from Hello Nasty, 1998
 "Dedication", by Brand Nubian from One for All, 1990
 "Dedication", by War from Eric Burdon Declares "War", 1970
 "Dedication", the closing theme music for the British TV programme Record Breakers

See also
Dedicated (disambiguation)